Tamade may refer to:
Tamade Station, the name of two train stations in Japan.
 Tamade Station (Nara) (玉手駅)
 Tamade Station (Osaka) (玉出駅)
Tamade (玉出), a supermarket chain in Japan
"Tāmāde" (他媽的), a commonly used vulgar word in Chinese.